Karrharde (North Frisian: Kårhiird) was an amt (collective municipality) in the district of Nordfriesland, in Schleswig-Holstein, Germany. It was situated on the border with Denmark, approx. 35 km north of Husum, and 25 km west of Flensburg. Its seat was in Leck, itself not part of the amt. In January 2008, it was merged with the Ämter Bökingharde, Süderlügum and Wiedingharde, and the municipalities Niebüll and Leck to form the Amt Südtondern.

The amt of Karrharde consisted of the following municipalities ( population in parentheses):

Achtrup (1548) 
Bramstedtlund (237) 
Enge-Sande (1150) 
Karlum (218) 
Klixbüll (932) 
Ladelund (1516) 
Sprakebüll (221) 
Stadum (1070) 
Tinningstedt (209) 
Westre (400)

Former Ämter in Schleswig-Holstein